Tell Sikkin (also known as Tell Sikkin Qa'dah) is a Syrian village located in the Mahardah Subdistrict of the Mahardah District in Hama Governorate. According to the Syria Central Bureau of Statistics (CBS), Tell Sikkin had a population of 1,963 in the 2004 census.

Tell Sikkin was noted by Eli Smith in 1838.

References

Bibliography

 

Populated places in Mahardah District